María del Carmen Félix (born October 31, 1982, in Hermosillo, Sonora, Mexico) is a Mexican actress best known for her role of Leticia Cabral in the Telemundo's series La Doña (2016–2017). Her first notable roles was in Drunk History Mexican version of the American series of the same name, In the series she played her great-aunt María Félix. Her other notable TV roles include Su nombre era Dolores, la Jenn que yo conocí, biographical series about the Mexican singer Jenni Rivera, and Enemigo íntimo.

Filmography

Film roles

Television roles

References

External links 
 

Living people
Mexican telenovela actresses
Mexican film actresses
21st-century Mexican actresses
1982 births